Joya-Maria Maroun Azzi (born 23 September 2000) is a Lebanese footballer who plays as a defensive midfielder or left-back for American club Iowa Raptors FC and the Lebanon national team.

Early life 
Born in Ajaltoun, Lebanon, Azzi grew up in Okaibe, where she began playing football aged four. She initially played with local boys teams, before playing futsal with her high school team aged 13.

Club career

Early career 
Azzi joined her first girls football team at 14 years old, when she moved to Zouk Mosbeh. She then played for the under-17s and under-18s, before making her senior debut. Aged 18, she moved to EFP, playing for both their under-19 and senior teams. Azzi played two years for EFP.

Central Methodist Eagles 
On 3 August 2021, Azzi joined the Central Methodist Eagles, the team of the Central Methodist University. She made her debut on 25 August, as a 60th-minute substitute in a 4–0 win against the William Woods Owls.

Azzi played 11 regular season games, and helped her team finish as both league and tournament champions of the 2021 Heart of America Athletic Conference Tournament. She also finished semi-finalist of the NAIA Women's Soccer Championship.

Iowa Raptors FC 
On 28 March 2022, Azzi moved to Iowa Raptors FC in the Women's Premier Soccer League.

International career 
In 2018, Azzi was called up to play for the Lebanon national under-19 team, playing eight games. She got her first call up to the senior team in 2018. Azzi was called up to represent Lebanon at the 2022 WAFF Women's Championship; she helped her side finish runners-up, scoring a goal against Syria on 4 September.

Career statistics

International 
Scores and results list Lebanon's goal tally first, score column indicates score after each Azzi goal.

Honours
Zouk Mosbeh
 Lebanese Women's Football League: 2017–18
 Lebanese Women's FA Cup: 2017–18
 Lebanese Women's Super Cup: 2017, 2018

EFP
 Lebanese Women's FA Cup: 2020–21

Central Methodist Eagles
 Heart of America Athletic Conference league champion: 2021
 Heart of America Athletic Conference tournament champion: 2021

Lebanon U18
 WAFF U-18 Women's Championship runner-up: 2018

Lebanon
 WAFF Women's Championship third place: 2019

See also
 List of Lebanon women's international footballers

References

External links

 Profile at WPSL
 Profile at the Central Methodist Eagles
 
 
 

2000 births
Living people
People from Keserwan District
Lebanese women's footballers
Women's association football midfielders
Women's association football fullbacks
Zouk Mosbeh SC footballers
Eleven Football Pro players
Central Methodist Eagles women's soccer players
Iowa Raptors FC (women) players
Lebanese Women's Football League players
Women's Premier Soccer League players
Lebanon women's youth international footballers
Lebanon women's international footballers
Lebanese expatriate women's footballers
Lebanese expatriate sportspeople in the United States
Expatriate women's soccer players in the United States
21st-century Lebanese women